Alexandra Panova was the defending champion, but chose not to participate.

Elina Svitolina won the title, defeating Lesia Tsurenko in the final, 6–1, 6–2.

Seeds

Main draw

Finals

Top half

Bottom half

References 
 Main draw
 Qualifying draw

Telavi Open - Singles
2012 in Georgian sport
Telavi Open